Kyle Smith (born October 15, 1984) is American football executive who is vice president of player personnel for the Atlanta Falcons of the National Football League (NFL). Prior to becoming an executive, he played college football as a wide receiver at Youngstown State University before spending some time in the NFL, as well as the Arena and Canadian Football Leagues. 

Smith became a scout for the Washington Redskins in 2011 and later worked with them in various executive roles during the late 2010s. He is the son of former San Diego Chargers general manager .

Early life
The son of former San Diego Chargers general manager A. J. Smith, Kyle Smith was born in Warwick, Rhode Island on October 15, 1984. He grew in the Buffalo metropolitan area while his father was an scout with the Buffalo Bills, later attending and playing wide receiver for Saint Francis High School. He was a team captain as a junior and senior, being named an All-Western New York selection during the latter. He finished his high school career as the team's leader in career receiving yards (1,904), career receptions (132) and single-season receptions (56). Smith also played basketball and ran track and field for the school, winning a title as a part of the 4 × 400 metres relay team.

Following high school, he received a full scholarship to attend Youngstown State where he played for the Youngstown State Penguins. He finished his career there with 101 career receptions, 1,536 receiving yards, 56 punt returns, and 377 return yards. As a junior in 2004, he was selected as the team's most outstanding offensive player, and was named the team's MVP as a senior the following year, as well as an All-Gateway Football Conference honorable mention. He also played in the 2006 Hula Bowl.

Playing career
Smith was signed as an undrafted free agent by the Minnesota Vikings in 2006 but was released prior to training camp. He later joined the Tampa Bay Buccaneers in January 2007, where they reassigned him to the Berlin Thunder of NFL Europe. He then returned to the Buccaneers later that year but was released prior to the regular season. He later spent some time with the Georgia Force and Arizona Rattlers of the Arena Football League in 2008 and the Winnipeg Blue Bombers of the Canadian Football League in 2009.

Executive career
In 2010, Smith joined the Washington Redskins as a scouting intern. He was hired full-time by the team in June 2011, being put in charge of the southeast region. He worked with his father A. J. during this period, who served as a consultant for the team from 2013–2015. Smith was promoted to director of college scouting in June 2017, where he had major influence in the team's NFL Draft selections during the late 2010s. Smith was further promoted to vice president of player personnel in January 2020. He left Washington in 2021 following a restructuring of their front office and joined the Atlanta Falcons under the same role later that year.

References

1984 births
American football wide receivers
Arizona Rattlers players
Berlin Thunder players
Georgia Force players
Minnesota Vikings players
Players of American football from Rhode Island
Sportspeople from Warwick, Rhode Island
Tampa Bay Buccaneers players
Washington Redskins executives
Washington Redskins scouts
Winnipeg Blue Bombers players
Youngstown State Penguins football players
Living people
Washington Football Team executives
Washington Football Team scouts
Atlanta Falcons executives